The ashy-fronted bulbul (Pycnonotus cinereifrons) is a member of the bulbul family of passerine birds. It is endemic to Palawan in the Philippines.  Its natural habitat is subtropical or tropical moist lowland forests. Until 2010, the ashy-fronted bulbul was considered as a subspecies of the olive-winged bulbul.

References

Oliveros, C.H., and R.G. Moyle (2010). Origin and diversification of Philippine bulbuls. Molecular Phylogenetics and Evolution 54:822–832.

ashy-fronted bulbul
Birds of Palawan
ashy-fronted bulbul